State Road 117 (SR 117) is a state road in the northern section of the U.S. state of Indiana. SR 117 was originally introduced in the early 1950s routed along its modern routing. The road was paved in the 1960s.

Route description
SR 117 starts at an intersection with SR 110, at the Fulton–Marshall county line, southeast of Culver. The highway head north, passing between a golf course and farmland, before curving and becoming an east–west roadway. The roadway head west towards Lake Maxinkuckee, before another curve turning the road back towards the north. North of the curve the road runs along the east side of the lake, passing by mostly houses. As the lake ends, SR 117 passes through Culver Military Academy, before ending at an intersection with SR 10, east of Culver. The highest traffic count for SR 117 in 2015 was at its northern end, where 1,215 vehicles travel the highway on average each day. The lowest traffic count during 2015 was at the southern end of SR 117, where 474 vehicles travel the highway on average each day.

History
Indiana State Highway Commission added SR 117 to the state system between 1950 and 1951, running along its modern routing. The entire roadway was paved between 1962 and 1963. No major changes have occurred to SR 117 since it was paved.

Major intersections

References

External links

117
Transportation in Marshall County, Indiana